Richard Charles Ackerman (born December 5, 1942) is an American Republican  politician, who was a California State Senator for the 33rd District, representing inland Orange County, from 2000 to 2008.

Born in Long Beach, California, Ackerman earned a B.A. in Mathematics from the University of California, Berkeley in 1964 and a J.D. from Hastings College of the Law in 1967. Ackerman and his wife, Linda, who married in 1968, have three children, Lauren, Marc, and Brett, and two granddaughters, Caitlin and Elizabeth.

Elected to the Fullerton City Council in 1980, Ackerman served three terms on the council, also serving as Mayor in 1982 and 1986.

California State Assembly career

Ackerman was elected to the California State Assembly from the 72nd District in a 1995 special election to replace Assemblyman Ross Johnson, who vacated the seat after winning a special election to the State Senate.  He was unopposed for re-election in 1996 and won 68% of the vote in 1998.  During his tenure in the Assembly, Ackerman served as Assistant Republican Leader, Republican Caucus Whip, Vice Chair of the Assembly Natural Resources Committee, Vice Chair of the Assembly Judiciary Committee, a member of Appropriations Committee, and a member of the Legislative Ethics Committee.

California State Senate career

After those three terms in the Assembly, Ackerman was elected to the State Senate in 2000.   In first year in the Senate, he became Vice Chair of the Senate Budget and Fiscal Review Committee.  Ackerman and his family moved from their long-time Fullerton residence in the northern part of his Senate District to Irvine in the central part of his Senate District.  In 2002, Ackerman agreed to run as a sacrificial lamb against incumbent Democratic Attorney General Bill Lockyer in the latter's bid for a second term, as no Republican sought the nomination for Attorney General and Ackerman could retain his Senate seat since it was not up for election until 2004. As expected, Lockyer won re-election and Ackerman stayed in the Senate.  On May 10, 2004, Ackerman was unanimously elected to serve as Senate Minority Leader.  Six months later, he won re-election to the Senate with 69% of the vote. On April 15, 2008, Ackerman officially handed over California Senate GOP leadership to fellow Long Beach-born State Senator Dave Cogdill.

References

External links
Dick Ackerman Political History

1942 births
Republican Party California state senators
Living people
Republican Party members of the California State Assembly
University of California, Hastings College of the Law alumni
UC Berkeley College of Letters and Science alumni
People from Fullerton, California
People from Irvine, California
People from Long Beach, California
21st-century American politicians